The Mao Formation is a geologic formation in the northwestern Dominican Republic. The reefal limestone and siltstone formation preserves bivalve, gastropod, echinoid and coral fossils dating back to the Pliocene period.

Fossil content 
 Antillia coatesi
 Diaphus aequalis
 Isophyllia jacksoni, I. maoensis
 Trachyphyllia mcneilli

See also 
 List of fossiliferous stratigraphic units in the Dominican Republic

References

Bibliography

Further reading 
 A. F. Budd and K. G. Johnson. 1999. Neogene Paleontology in the northern Dominican Republic 19: The family Faviidae (Anthozoa, Scleractinia) part II: The genera Caulastraea, Favia, Diploria, Thysanus, Hadrophyllia, Manicina and Colpophyllia. Bulletins of American Paleontology 356:1-83
 A. W. Janssen. 1999. Neogene Paleontology in the Northern Dominican Republic 20. Holoplanktonic Mollusks (Gastropoda: Heteropoda and Thecosomata). Bulletins of American Paleontology (358)1-40
 A. Logan. 1987. Neogene paleontology in the northern Dominican Republic 6. The phylum Brachiopoda. Bulletins of American Paleontology 93(328):44-55
 J. B. Saunders, P. Jung, and B. Biju-Duval. 1986. Neogene Paleontology in the Northern Dominican Republic: 1. Field Surveys, Lithology, Environment, and Age. Bulletins of American Paleontology 89(323):1-79

Geologic formations of the Dominican Republic
Neogene Dominican Republic
Limestone formations
Siltstone formations
Reef deposits